Emma Wade (born 1980) is a Belizean sprinter. She competed in the Women's 200 meters event at the 2004 Olympic Games. She was eliminated in Round 1 but achieved a personal best time of 23.43 seconds.

External links 

 belizeans.com

Living people
1980 births
Belizean female sprinters
Olympic athletes of Belize
Athletes (track and field) at the 2004 Summer Olympics
Athletes (track and field) at the 2002 Commonwealth Games
Athletes (track and field) at the 2006 Commonwealth Games
Place of birth missing (living people)
Date of birth missing (living people)
Commonwealth Games competitors for Belize
Olympic female sprinters